Tang ZhengDong, (born September 14, 1982 in Suzhou, Jiangsu, China) is a former Chinese professional basketball player. At a height of 2.13 m (7'0"), and a weight of 130 kg (287 lbs.), he plays at the center position. He is currently playing for the Xinjiang Flying Tigers.

Professional career
Tang began basketball training in 1995, and he eventually joined the Jiangsu Dragons of the Chinese Basketball Association (CBA). In the 2003–04, 2004–05, and 2006–07 seasons, he was awarded the Chinese Basketball Association MVP award. In 2006, Tang worked out for the NBA's Toronto Raptors.

Chinese national team
Tang trained numerous times with the senior men's Chinese national basketball teamas a center playing behind Yao Ming and Mengke Bateer. He played with China at the 2005 Stanković Cup.

Player profile
Tang stands 2.13 m (7'0") tall, and has a robust 130 kg (287 lbs.) frame.  As a center, he is not speedy.  His shooting is accurate, so much so, that he is a 3-point shot threat.  His playing style has been compared to that of fellow Chinese basketball player Mengke Bateer.

Notes
 This article was originally translated from :zh:唐正东.

References

External links
Tang Zhengdong statistics at Sina.com  

1984 births
Living people
Centers (basketball)
Basketball players from Jiangsu
Chinese men's basketball players
Jiangsu Dragons players
Sportspeople from Suzhou
Xinjiang Flying Tigers players
Asian Games medalists in basketball
Basketball players at the 2006 Asian Games
Basketball players at the 2010 Asian Games
Asian Games gold medalists for China
Medalists at the 2006 Asian Games
Medalists at the 2010 Asian Games